Ayuo Takahashi (born October 19, 1960) is a Japanese-born American composer, poet, lyricist, singer and performer of plucked string instruments including guitar, bouzouki, Irish harp, Chinese zheng, Japanese koto, and medieval European psaltery. He is adept at adapting the ancient music of Japan, China, Persia, Greece and medieval Europe to create a new and original music without abandoning their strict forms, while simultaneously making them relevant to contemporary music styles. He has composed for classical ensembles including string quartets, piano, various chamber ensembles and orchestra, as well as composed, produced and performed with rock, jazz and musicians of various traditional music from around the world. He has also composed many music theater pieces, some of which has been released on CD in the United States and Japan.

Biography

Ayuo Takahashi was born in Tokyo, and spent his early childhood traveling in Germany, Sweden and France with his parents. His father, Yuji Takahashi, is a composer of contemporary classical music and a pianist known for premiering works by Iannis Xenakis and John Cage. Ayuo and his parents settled in New York City in 1966. Ayuo grew up listening to both the new avant-garde experimental and contemporary music and the psychedelic rock music of the 1960s. He often went to museums, art galleries and cinemas to see exhibitions of contemporary art and the new cinema. At the same time, he also saw Japanese traditional Noh plays, and heard ancient and medieval music from Japan and Europe. All these were to become important influences in Ayuo's music and music-theater pieces. Ayuo's parents divorced in 1969, and Ayuo's mother married an American of Iranian descent, who came from a family that performed traditional Persian music in the courts of the Iranian Shah. This gave Ayuo the opportunity to hear Persian traditional music, which was also to leave a lasting influence on his music.

In 1975, Ayuo's mother and step-father separated, while Ayuo was visiting his father in Japan, forcing him to live there. His first studio recording was in 1976 with his father, Yuji Takahashi, Ryuichi Sakamoto, and Masahiko Togashi on the CD "Twilight" released on Columbia Records in Japan.

Adjusting to life in Japan as a teenager was difficult, and Ayuo would later make that the main theme on his CD "What We Look Like In The Picture" released in 2006 from Zipangu in Japan.
Ayuo spent his high school years writing poetry and appearing in poetry reading competitions.

Ayuo joined Keiji Haino's group "Fushitsusha" in 1979, and performed improvisation with many musicians in what was the final period of the "free music scene" in Japan of the 1970s.

Ayuo studied the traditional plucked string instrument, Biwa, with Kinshi Tsuruta. He studied contemporary music composition with Minao Shibata and Joji Yuasa.

His first solo record,"Carmina", was recorded in 1983 and released in 1984 from Epic-Sony. Since then, he has released over a dozen solo albums, collaborating with a diverse group of individuals, including Peter Hammill, Ryuichi Sakamoto, Danny Thompson, Maddy Prior,  Takehisa Kosugi, Carlos Alomar, John Zorn, Bill Laswell, Dave Mattacks, Yohji Yamamoto, Jadranka Stojaković, Hiromi Ōta, Yoko Ueno, Clive Deamer,  Mikigami Koichi,  Wataru Ohkuma, Aki Takahashi,  Mie Miki, Kazue Sawai and many Japanese traditional musicians. Three CDs of his music have been released in the United States from the TZADIK label in the 21st century.

Ayuo has composed music for films, ballet, contemporary dance, and theater. Border Line, directed by the Japanese film director Lee Sang-il in 2002, features music mostly performed alone by Ayuo.

Music

Ayuo has a unique distinctive style in his music. He can create music which balances on traditions of world music, improvisation, new age, psychedelic, avant-pop, electronica and classical composition, without losing his distinctive voice in the music he creates. 
For the first Tzadik CD, he was introduced as the "one of the most enigmatic figures in Japan".

He has also made unique arrangements of compositions by Erik Satie, Claude Debussy, Richard Wagner, Maurice Ravel, Toru Takemitsu and other classical composers

Lyrics

Ayuo's lyrics are often about difficulties in human relationship, especially between different cultures, and between men and women. His lyrics often include scientific, literary or historical references. He often uses texts by philosophers from Japan, Middle East, and Europe, such as Dogen, Rumi, Kazantzakis, and others. Two of his music-theater compositions are based on a medieval Japanese Noh play by Zeami. Another music-theater composition is based on the story "Blue Eyes, Black Hair" by Marguerite Duras. There are also compositions based on mythic themes, such as the story of Pele and Hi'iaka from Hawaii, and story of the Sun god from ancient India. Ayuo often writes on the liner notes of his CDs that he was influenced by the scholar of world myths and comparative religion, Joseph Campbell.

Discography

Albums released in Japan 

Carmina (1984)
Silent Film (1985)
Shizukani Okitegoran (1985)
Memory Theatre (1985)
Nova Carmina (1986)
Blue Eyes, Black Hair (1995)
Heavenly Garden Orchestra (1995)
Songs from a Eurasian Journey (1997)
Earth Guitar (2000)
Stoned (2002)
E No Naka No Sugata (What We Look Like In The Picture) (2006)
dna (2009)

Albums released in the US 

Izutsu (2000)
Red Moon (2004)
AOI (2005)

Albums released in South Korea 

Songs from a Eurasian Journey (1998)

Albums produced by Ayuo 

Kazue Sawai/ Me to Me (Eye to Eye)(1988)

External links
 
 https://www.youtube.com/user/NovaCarmina?feature=mhee
 singersong.homestead.com
 www.psychemusic.org
 www.allmusic.com/artist/ayuo-q70718

1960 births
20th-century American composers
20th-century American guitarists
20th-century American male musicians
20th-century classical composers
20th-century Japanese composers
20th-century Japanese guitarists
20th-century Japanese male musicians
21st-century American composers
21st-century American guitarists
21st-century American male musicians
21st-century classical composers
21st-century Japanese composers
21st-century Japanese guitarists
21st-century Japanese male musicians
American classical composers
American classical guitarists
American experimental musicians
American film score composers
American lyricists
American male classical composers
American male film score composers
American male guitarists
American male singers
American male songwriters
American record producers
Artists from New York (state)
Classical musicians from New York (state)
Japanese classical composers
Japanese classical guitarists
Japanese experimental musicians
Japanese film score composers
Japanese lyricists
Japanese male classical composers
Japanese male film score composers
Japanese male singers
Japanese record producers
Japanese songwriters
Living people
Singers from Tokyo
Tzadik Records artists